Gisela Riera Roura (born  7 May 1976) is a retired Spanish tennis player.

Riera won four singles and eight doubles ITF titles during her career and on 7 June 1999 reached a singles ranking high of world number 136. On 12 June 2000, she peaked at number 71 in the WTA doubles rankings.

Riera retired from professional tennis 2010.

Personal
Born in Barcelona, Riera started playing tennis at age eight. She prefers clay over hard courts. Her father's name is Jose Maria; mother's name is Angel; has four older siblings: Jose Maria, Carina, Leo and Rafael.

WTA career finals

Doubles: 1 runner-up

ITF finals

Singles (4–4)

Doubles (8–12)

Grand Slam doubles performance timeline

External links
 
 

1976 births
Living people
Tennis players from Barcelona
Spanish female tennis players
Sportswomen from Catalonia
20th-century Spanish women